A blackwater river is a river with a deep, slow-moving channel flowing through forested swamps or wetlands.

Blackwater River may also refer to:

Canada 
 West Road River (also Blackwater River), a major tributary of the Fraser River

Ireland 
 Kerry Blackwater, a river in County Kerry
 Munster Blackwater, a river which flows through Counties Kerry, Cork, and Waterford
 Kells Blackwater also known as Leinster Blackwater, flowing from Lough Ramor, County Cavan, to Navan, County Meath
 Enfield Blackwater, flowing from Staplestown, County Kildare, to the River Boyne in County Meath
 Blackwater River, a distributary of the River Shannon
 Kilkenny Blackwater, a tributary of the River Suir in County Kilkenny

New Zealand 
 Blackwater River (Tasman), a tributary to the Mangles River
 Blackwater River (Buller River tributary)
 Blackwater River (Little Grey River tributary)

United Kingdom

England
 Blackwater River (River Axe), a tributary of the River Axe in Devon and Dorset
 River Blackwater, Essex
 Blackwater Estuary
 River Blackwater (River Loddon), a tributary of the Loddon forming boundaries of Hampshire with Surrey and Berkshire 
 River Blackwater (River Test), a tributary of the Test in Wiltshire and Hampshire

Northern Ireland
 River Blackwater (Northern Ireland)

Scotland
 Black Water (Conon), in Wester Ross, Scotland

United States 

 Blackwater River (Alabama), a river in Baldwin County
 Blackwater River (Florida), a river arising in southern Alabama and flowing through the Florida Panhandle to the Gulf of Mexico
 Blackwater River (Maine), a river in Aroostook County
 Blackwater River (Maryland), a largely saltwater river in Dorchester County
 Little Blackwater River (Maryland), a tributary
 Blackwater River (Massachusetts–New Hampshire), a tidal inlet in northeastern Massachusetts and southeastern New Hampshire
 Blackwater River (Missouri), a tributary of the Lamine River
 Blackwater River (Contoocook River tributary), a river in central New Hampshire
 Blackwater River (Virginia), a river in southeastern Virginia
 Blackwater River (West Virginia), a river in the Allegheny Mountains (with a tributary named Little Blackwater River)

See also 
Blackwater (disambiguation)